"On top of the world" is an idiom which means 'exceptionally pleased, happy, or satisfied'. It may also refer to:

Music

Albums
 On Top of the World (album) or the title song, by 8Ball & MJG, 1995
 On Top of the World, a Pink Floyd bootleg recording, 1970
 On Top of the World, an EP by Milburn, 2002

Songs
 "(How Does It Feel to Be) On Top of the World", by England United, 1998
 "On Top of the World" (Imagine Dragons song), 2013
 "On Top of the World", by Ari Koivunen, 2007
 "On Top of the World", by Boys Like Girls from Boys Like Girls, 2006
 "On Top of the World", by Cheap Trick from Heaven Tonight, 1978
 "On Top of the World", by Edsilia Rombley representing Netherlands in the Eurovision Song Contest 2007
 "On Top of the World", by Jett Rebel from Venus & Mars, 2014
 "On Top of the World", by John Mayall & the Blues Breakers, recorded in 1966 but not officially released until  2006 on the 40th Anniversary Edition of Blues Breakers with Eric Clapton; covered by the La De Das, 1966
 "On Top of the World", by T.I. from Paper Trail, 2008

Other uses
 On Top of the World, Florida, US, a census-designated place
 On Top of the World (film), a 1936 British film directed by Redd Davis
 On Top of the World, a 1987 play by Michael Gow

See also
 Top of the World (disambiguation)